Elections to Dacorum Borough Council in Hertfordshire, England were held on 6 May 1999. The election in Highfield St Paul was delayed after the death of a Conservative candidate until a by-election was held on 3 June. The whole council was up for election with boundary changes since the last Dacorum Council election, 1995 reducing the number of seats by 6. The Conservative Party gained overall control of the council from no overall control, although it would fall back to no overall control after the by-election in June.

Election result

Ward results

References

 "How the nations voted", The Times 8 May 1999 page 48
1999 Dacorum election result
Ward results

1999
1999 English local elections
1990s in Hertfordshire